Argyresthia semitestacella is a moth of the family Yponomeutidae. It is found in Europe.

The wingspan is 11–14 mm. The head is yellowish white. Forewings are light ferruginous-brown, faintly purplish tinged; a thick whitish dorsal streak to tornus, interrupted by a dark ferruginous-brown triangular median spot. Hindwings are grey.

The moth flies from July to October. .

The larvae feed on beech.

References

Notes
The flight season refers to Belgium and The Netherlands. This may vary in other parts of the range.

Moths described in 1833
Argyresthia
Moths of Europe